Brian Patrick Clarke (born August 1, 1952) is an American actor. He has appeared in many television series and features.

Early life
Clarke was born in Gettysburg, Pennsylvania.

Clarke, a punter, was a three-time varsity football letterwinner at Yale University, playing for Carmen Cozza in the early seventies.

Career
Clarke starred as Greg Marmalard on the TV sitcom Delta House. He played a recurring character for two seasons on the comedy-drama Eight is Enough, Merle "The Pearl" Stockwell, a professional baseball player who marries middle sister, Susan (Susan Richardson).

He has made guest appearances on many TV series, including Baywatch, Party of Five, ER, CSI: Miami, and Drop Dead Diva. He has appeared on the soap operas General Hospital, The Bold and the Beautiful, The Young and the Restless, and Sunset Beach. He also appeared in the films Blood and Guts (1978), Sleepaway Camp II: Unhappy Campers (1988) and Exorcism (2003).

Personal life
Clarke is married to Olympian artistic gymnast and sports commentator Kathy Johnson. They have two sons, Sean, a pole vaulter who competes for the University of Pennsylvania, and Cary from a previous marriage. They reside in Orlando, Florida.

He has run several marathons, including a sub three-hour marathon in Los Angeles in the late 1980s.

References

External links

1952 births
Living people
American male television actors
American male film actors
American male soap opera actors
Yale University alumni